Fernanda Doval  (born ) is a retired Brazilian female volleyball player. She was part of the Brazil women's national volleyball team.

She participated in the 1994 FIVB Volleyball Women's World Championship. On club level she played with Ponto Frio/Santa Rita.

Clubs
 Ponto Frio/Santa Rita (1994)

References

1975 births
Living people
Brazilian women's volleyball players
Place of birth missing (living people)
Sportspeople from Belo Horizonte